Dr. Bharati Pravin Pawar is an Indian politician currently serving as the Minister of State for Health and Family Welfare of India from 7 July 2021.  She was elected to the 17th Lok Sabha, lower house of the Parliament of India from Dindori, Loksabha Constituency Maharashtra in the 2019 Indian general election as member of the Bharatiya Janata Party .

She has been awarded as Best Women Parliamentarian in December 2019 - by Lokmat Media Group

Early life
Bharti Pawar was born on 13 September 1978 in Narul-Kalwan, Adivasi region of Nashik, Maharashtra. She is married to Pravin Pawar.

She is the daughter in law of former minister Arjun Tulshiram Pawar.

Education
Pawar earned MBBS in 2002 from N.D.M.V.P's Medical College, Nashik.

Political career
Bharti started her career as a Member of Zilla Parishad. She contested Lok Sabha election in 2014 as a Nationalist Congress Party candidate and was defeated by Bharatiya Janata Party candidate. She requested candidacy again in 2019 but her request was declined by Nationalist Congress Party. She joined the BJP in 2019. She won the election after joining Bharatiya Janata Party.

Her father-in-law was 8 time MLA from same region and served as minister of state for tribal welfare in the First Deshmukh ministry of Government of Maharashtra.

Positions Held
Member, Zilla Parishad (2012 - 2019)
Member of Parliament, 17th Lok Sabha (2019 - incumbent)  
Member, Standing Committee on Health and Family Welfare (2019 - incumbent)
Member, Committee on Petitions (2019 - incumbent)
Member, Consultative Committee, Ministry of Skill Development and Entrepreneurship (2019 - incumbent)
Minister of State in the Ministry of Health and Family Welfare (July 2021 - incumbent)
She became union minister from Nashik region after 59 years. She is also the first female union minister from Nashik.

Awards
 Best Women Parliamentarian (2019) - by Lokmat Media Group

References

External links
  Official biographical sketch in Parliament of India website

Women union ministers of state of India
Women members of the Lok Sabha
India MPs 2019–present
Lok Sabha members from Maharashtra
Living people
Bharatiya Janata Party politicians from Maharashtra
1978 births
People from Nashik district
Narendra Modi ministry
Health ministers of India
Nationalist Congress Party politicians from Maharashtra
21st-century Indian women politicians